"You're My World" is a song written by Emilia Rydberg and Figge Boström, and performed by Emilia Rydberg at Melodifestivalen 2009. The song participated at the semifinal in Scandinavium in the town of Gothenburg on 7 February 2009, reaching the finals where the song ended up 9th.

Emilia Rydberg described the song as a "tribute to those we love, and the warmth they give us".

The song was awarded a Marcel Bezençon Awards in 2009 for best Melodifestivalen composition of 2009.

The single peaked at third position at the Swedish singles chart. On 3 May 2009 the song also entered Svensktoppen, where it stayed for seven weeks until 14 June 2009 peaking at eight position before leaving chart.

Charts

Weekly charts

Year-end charts

References 

Information at Svensk mediedatabas

English-language Swedish songs
Songs written by Figge Boström
Songs written by Emilia Rydberg
Melodifestivalen songs of 2009
Soul songs
Emilia Rydberg songs
2009 songs